Chen Tang Jie (born 5 January 1998) is a Malaysian badminton player. He was part of the Malaysian 2016 Asian Junior Championships and 2016 BWF World Junior Championships team, and has help Malaysia to clinched a silver medal in the World Junior mixed team before defeated by China.

Career 
Chen was selected into the Malaysian squad for 2016 World Junior Championships. Before that, he had shown his commitment on the court by reaching quarter final of Asia Junior Championships with Pearly Tan in July 2016. They were just paired up few weeks before the tournament and was defeated by the Korean pair Kim Won-ho and Lee Yu-rim (defeated 17–21, 16–21), At the World Junior Championships, Chen took part in both men's and mixed doubles, where he partnered with Man Wei Chong and Toh Ee Wei respectively. He showed his potential by finishing with a bronze medal in mixed doubles with Toh before the duo were beaten by the Chinese pair He Jiting and Du Yue in straight games (14–21, 11–21).

Achievements

Southeast Asian Games 
Mixed doubles

BWF World Junior Championships 
Mixed doubles

BWF World Tour (1 runner-up) 
The BWF World Tour, which was announced on 19 March 2017 and implemented in 2018, is a series of elite badminton tournaments sanctioned by the Badminton World Federation (BWF). The BWF World Tours are divided into levels of World Tour Finals, Super 1000, Super 750, Super 500, Super 300 (part of the BWF World Tour), and the BWF Tour Super 100.

Mixed doubles

BWF International Challenge/Series (4 titles, 3 runners-up) 
Men's doubles

Mixed doubles

  BWF International Challenge tournament
  BWF International Series tournament
  BWF Future Series tournament

References

External links 
 

1998 births
Living people
People from Ipoh
Malaysian sportspeople of Chinese descent
Malaysian male badminton players
Competitors at the 2021 Southeast Asian Games
Southeast Asian Games silver medalists for Malaysia
Southeast Asian Games medalists in badminton
21st-century Malaysian people